Kenyatta University Solar Power Station is a  solar power plant under construction in Kenya.

Location
The power station is located on the main campus of Kenyatta University, who own the power station. The geographical coordinates of this power station are:1°10'48.0"S, 36°55'18.0"E (Latitude:-1.180000; Longitude:36.921667).

Overview
The power generated is expected to be consumed by the university, with the rest sold to Kenya Power and Lighting Company for integration into the national power grid. The first phase, of 100 kW, which was commissioned in December 2017, occupies .

Construction timeline, costs, and funding
US$167,000). The French solar panel manufacturer Urbasolar, supplied the solar panels with funding assistance from the government of France. The completed 10MW power station is budgeted at KSh1.7 billion (approx. US$16.7 million).

See also

List of power stations in Kenya
Kenya Electricity Generating Company
Kenya Electricity Transmission Company

References

External links
 Website of Kenya Rural Electrification Authority

Solar power stations in Kenya
Nairobi